The men's and women's softball tournaments at the 2003 Pan American Games were held in August  2003 in Santo Domingo, Dominican Republic.  The men's tournament was discontinued after the 2003 Pan American Games, as it was decided to eliminate all non-Olympic Sports from the Pan American Games.

Medal summary

Medal table

Medalists

Softball at the Pan American Games
Events at the 2003 Pan American Games
2003 in softball
Softball in the Dominican Republic